A Motion to Adjourn is a 1921 American silent comedy film directed by Roy Clements and starring Harry L. Rattenberry, Roy Stewart and Marjorie Daw.

Synopsis
The playboy son of a wealthy New York financier is disinherited when he takes the blame for a crime committed by his brother and goes West to seek his own living in a mining town.

Cast
 Harry L. Rattenberry as Silas Warner 
 Roy Stewart as Silas Warner Jr
 Sidney D'Albrook as Archie Warner
 Evelyn Nelson as 	Louise Warner
 Norval MacGregor as Doc Bleeker
 Marjorie Daw as Sally Bleeker
 Peggy Blackwood as Valentine
 William A. Carroll as Joe Selinsky
 Charles King as The Bartender 
 William White as Faro Dan 
 Jim Welch as Butterfly Kid

References

Bibliography
 Munden, Kenneth White. The American Film Institute Catalog of Motion Pictures Produced in the United States, Part 1. University of California Press, 1997.

External links
 

1921 films
1921 comedy films
1920s English-language films
American silent feature films
Silent American comedy films
Films directed by Roy Clements
Arrow Film Corporation films
1920s American films